Mary Loomis was a Union nurse during the American Civil War. Loomis served for a total of two and a half years.

Civil War service 
When the Civil War broke out, Loomis was living with her husband in Coldwater, Michigan. She enlisted in the service as a volunteer nurse alongside her husband in May 1861; they were both in the 1st Michigan Light Artillery. Loomis was later appointed to Hospital Number 13 in Nashville, Tennessee, to serve as the hospital matron. She worked at this location from September 1862 until January 1863. In Nashville, Loomis served under a surgeon by the name of H.J.Merrick, MD. She then went on to the Number 20 hospital, also in Nashville, until May. Once again, Loomis served as a matron, this time under the surgeon J.R. Goodwin, MD. Loomis only served in hospitals for a year of her service. The rest of the time, she was in camp with her regiment or marching from one place to the other with them. Her husband died in the Battle of Chickamauga in September 1863, and Loomis left the service shortly after in November.

References 

Women in the American Civil War
People from Coldwater, Michigan
Year of death missing
Year of birth missing
American Civil War nurses
American women nurses